Sabine Leidig (born 7 August 1961) is a German politician. Born in Heidelberg, Baden-Württemberg, she represents The Left. Sabine Leidig has served as a member of the Bundestag from the state of Hesse since 2009.

Life 
After completing her vocational training as a biology laboratory assistant in 1979, she worked for ten years at the Institute of Immunology and Genetics at the German Cancer Research Centre. From 2002 to 2009 she was managing director of Attac Germany. She became member of the bundestag after the 2009 German federal election. She is a member of the Committee on Transport and Digital Infrastructure. She is spokeswoman for railway policy for her parliamentary group. Leidig announcet, that she will not run for a reelection in the 2021 German federal election.

References

External links 

  
 Bundestag biography 

1961 births
Living people
Members of the Bundestag for Hesse
Female members of the Bundestag
21st-century German women politicians
Members of the Bundestag 2017–2021
Members of the Bundestag 2013–2017
Members of the Bundestag 2009–2013
Members of the Bundestag for The Left